Susan Julia Wightman (née Tooby; born 24 October 1960) is a retired long-distance runner from Great Britain. Representing Wales, she finished sixth in the 10,000 metres at the 1986 Commonwealth Games. She set her personal best of 2:31:33 in the marathon, when finishing 12th at the 1988 Seoul Olympics. At the 1988 Great North Run, she became the first British woman to run a sub-70-minute half-marathon, running 69:46 to finish second behind Greta Waitz. This would stand as the UK record until 1991 when Liz McColgan ran 69:15.

Personal life
Born in Woolhope, Herefordshire, England, Wightman is the twin sister of 1988 World Cross Country silver medallist Angela Tooby. She is married to former distance runner and marathoner Geoff Wightman, now a long-time media commentator on athletics. They have three children, twin sons Jake (the winner of the 1500 metres at the 2022 World Athletics Championships) and Sam, and a daughter, Martha.

International competitions

References

External links
 sports-reference
 

1960 births
Living people
Sportspeople from Herefordshire
Welsh female marathon runners
British female marathon runners
British female long-distance runners
Welsh female long-distance runners
Athletes (track and field) at the 1986 Commonwealth Games
Commonwealth Games competitors for Wales
Olympic athletes of Great Britain
Athletes (track and field) at the 1988 Summer Olympics
Twin sportspeople
English twins